Cambodia–India relations, also known as Cambodian-Indian relations, are the bilateral relations between the Kingdom of Cambodia and the Republic of India. Cambodia has an embassy in New Delhi, and India has an embassy in Phnom Penh.

Relations between Cambodia and India goes back to ancient times. India's influence in Cambodia is visible from the Hindu-style temples of Angkor Wat to written Khmer, which is a derivative of the Pallava script from present-day southern India.

Both nations are part of the Non-Aligned Movement.  India established formal diplomatic relations with the People's Republic of Kampuchea and opened its embassy in Phnom Penh in 1981 when Cambodia was internationally isolated. India had provided various personnel to conduct the country's UNTAC-sponsored elections in 1993. The Government of India agreed to preserve Angkor Wat temple when the Government of Cambodia appealed, between 1986 and 1993 and spent around 4 million dollars during this conservation.

While Cambodia has historically aligned itself more with the People's Republic of China, India's greatest geopolitical rival, Theravāda Buddhism is the country's state religion, practiced by around 95% of the population, and its intrinsic Indian culture has considerably impacted the society and culture.

State visits
 
The former President of India, Pratibha Patil, visited Cambodia in 2010 on a state visit and asked the Indian diaspora in the country to, "be the bridge between the two countries to access knowledge, expertise, resources and markets for the development of the country of their origin". While human resource development and capacity building have been the primary focus of our bilateral relations, India is extremely happy to cooperate with Cambodia in infrastructural projects, as well as in projects related to conservation and preservation of historical monuments."

Prime Minister Samdech Hun Sen visited India in January 2018. The two countries signed four key agreement to enhance bilateral cooperation during the visit. The agreements include an MoU on the prevention of human trafficking, a mutual legal assistance treaty in criminal matters, a cultural exchange programme, and a $36.92 million line of credit from India to help develop the Stung Sva Hab water resource development project. India and Cambodia also agreed on facilitating exchanges between senior-level defence personnel and capacity-building projects, and also jointly endorsed the UN Convention on the Law of the Sea (UNCLOS).

Indian diaspora in Cambodia

The first Indians in modern times to settle in Cambodia arrived in the 1960s and 1970s. Primarily coming from the northern province of Punjab, they worked as jewellers, moneylenders and traders around Central Market, but they left the country once the Khmer Rouge arrived. The Indians returned to Cambodia when Pol Pot’s regime collapsed.

There is an Indian diaspora in Cambodia and they have established an Indian Association, Cambodia.

References

Further reading
Lokesh, Chandra, & International Academy of Indian Culture. (2000). Society and culture of Southeast Asia: Continuities and changes. New Delhi: International Academy of Indian Culture and Aditya Prakashan. 

R. C. Majumdar, Study of Sanskrit in South-East Asia
R. C. Majumdar, Champa, Ancient Indian Colonies in the Far East, Vol.I, Lahore, 1927. 
R. C. Majumdar, Suvarnadvipa, Ancient Indian Colonies in the Far East, Vol.II, Calcutta,
R. C. Majumdar, Kambuja Desa Or An Ancient Hindu Colony In Cambodia, Madras, 1944
R. C. Majumdar, Hindu Colonies in the Far East, Calcutta, 1944, 
R. C. Majumdar, India and South-East Asia, I.S.P.Q.S. History and Archaeology Series Vol. 6, 1979, .
R. C. Majumdar, Ancient Indian colonisation in South-East Asia; History of the Hindu Colonization and Hindu Culture in South-East Asia

 
India
Bilateral relations of India